46th Infantry Division may refer to:

 46th Infantry Division (Russian Empire)
 46th Infantry Division (United Kingdom)
 46th Infantry Division (United States)
 46th Infantry Division (Wehrmacht)